Mount Dedo is a conspicuous needle-like peak,  high, standing south of Orne Harbour on the west coast of Graham Land. It was charted by the Belgian Antarctic Expedition under Gerlache of 1897–99. The name appears on an Argentine government chart of 1954 and is descriptive - "dedo" meaning finger in Spanish.

References

Mountains of Graham Land
Danco Coast